The ninth season of the American television series The Masked Singer premiered on Fox on February 15, 2023.

Panelists and host

Nick Cannon, singer-songwriter Robin Thicke, television and radio personality Jenny McCarthy Wahlberg, actor and comedian Ken Jeong, and recording artist Nicole Scherzinger all return as host and panelists.

The second episode included Nick Viall and Shangela as additional guests, the third episode included Luann de Lesseps and Theresa Caputo as additional guests, the fourth episode included Helen Mirren, Zachary Levi, and Jim Lee as additional guests with Jennifer Nettles appearing in a post-credit gag, and the fifth episode featured Nettles as a guest panelist, with Elmo, Big Bird, Cookie Monster, Oscar the Grouch, Grover, Count von Count, Abby Cadabby, and Elmo's puppy Tango as additional guests.

Buffalo Bills safety Damar Hamlin appeared as a guest in the fifth episode along with his younger brother, Damir. The episode was filmed in January 2023, a few weeks after his cardiac arrest medical incident.

Production
The season is formatted similar to its predecessor, featuring three contestants in each episode, with one eliminated mid-show and taken to the VIP section and the other two battling it out in a Battle Royale. A champion is crowned at the end of each episode who then moves on to the following episode, with the other singer in the top two unmasking. However, it also introduces a gimmick known as the "Ding Dong Keep It On" bell, which allows a panelist to save a singer from elimination. The bell can only be used once per group. There will be a special episode where those saved by the "Ding Dong Keep It On" bell will compete for a second chance to stay in the competition.

The season also features the return of themed nights, a gimmick introduced in the previous season. The season is set to include themes such as "Opening Night", "ABBA", "New York", "DC Superhero", "Sesame Street", "80s Night", "Country", "Movie Night", and "Space".

Contestants
The contestants in this season are reported to have a combined 95,231,000 records sold, 28 Emmy nominations, 26 books, 10 gold albums, six Grammy wins, five lifetime achievement awards, five medals, four Golden Globe nominations, four stars on the Hollywood Walk of Fame, and two Tony Award nominations.

Episodes

Week 1 (February 15)

 After being unmasked, Van Dyke sang "Supercalifragilisticexpialidocious" from Mary Poppins as his encore performance.

Week 2 (February 22) - "ABBA Night"

Week 3 (March 1) - "New York Night"
Guest performance: Panelist Robin Thicke performs "Living in New York City"

After being unmasked, Grandmaster Flash scratched along to "Good Times" by Chic as his encore performance.

Week 4 (March 8) - "DC Superheroes Night"
Guest performance: Panelist Nicole Scherzinger performs "Holding Out for a Hero"

 After being unmasked, Bolton performed his signature song "How Am I Supposed to Live Without You" as his encore performance.

Week 5 (March 15) - "Sesame Street Night"
Guest performance: Sesame Street characters perform "Dynamite" by BTS

Ratings

Notes

References

2023 American television seasons
The Masked Singer (American TV series)